SE Racing was a BMX bicycle company which was founded in 1977 by Scot Breithaupt (Scot Enterprises). The company manufactured the PK Ripper BMX bike and the Floval Flyer. The PK Ripper is the longest running production BMX bike.

History

SE Racing
The company was originally called Scot Enterprises and later SE Racing. SE Racing began experimenting with flat oval aluminum tubing that they called Floval. In 1977 SE Racing produced the JU-6 which was named after Jeff Utterback from their racing team. He finished 6th nationally. The Floval frame featured elongated aluminum tubes with long welds which eliminated the need for Gusset plates. The aluminum frame was also one third the weight of Chromoly. The Floval also had 24' wheels.

In 1979 the PK Ripper was manufactured by SE Racing. The bike was named for BMX racer Perry Kramer. When the bike was introduced it was considered cutting edge, and 2000 units were sold before the company had shipped any units. The PK Ripper is the longest production BMX bike and is still in production as of 2022.

SE Bikes
SE Racing is now called Sports Engineering Bikes (SE Bikes). They continue to produce the PK Ripper and the Floval Flyer. The company has collaborated with the shoe company Vans to create BMX shoes.

Advanced Sports International is now the owner of SE Bikes, and they are headquartered in Philadelphia.

See also
List of BMX bicycle manufacturers

References

Cycle manufacturers of the United States
American companies established in 1977
Companies based in Philadelphia
Companies that filed for Chapter 11 bankruptcy in 2018
BMX